Verity Stob is the pseudonym of a British satirical columnist. Stob is an anonymous software developer, the author of humorous and satirical articles about information technology, particularly software development. Since 1988, she has written her "Verity Stob" column for .EXE magazine, Dr. Dobb's Journal, and  website The Register. Stob was described as "the author of the longest-running satirical column on computer programming" by her fellow columnist, Andrew Orlowski.

Career
Stob has been a computer and web programmer since 1984, mostly using Delphi, C++, and PHP.

In 1988, she started her pseudonymous "Verity Stob" column for .EXE magazine (now defunct). Later, she moved it to Dr. Dobb's Journal. Since 2003, her column has appeared in the British technology news and opinion website, The Register.

She lives and works in London, United Kingdom.

References

Bibliography
 Stob, Verity (2005). The Best of Verity Stob: Highlights of Verity Stob's Famous Columns from EXE, Dr Dobb's Journal, and The Register, Apress LP. .

External links

Articles
 "How to survive a code walk-through" (originally from .EXE Magazine) at JSquared
 List of Stob articles at The Register (since 2003)
 List of Stob articles at Dr. Dobb's Journal (some articles require subscription)

Books
 The Best of Verity Stob at Apress (publisher)
 The Best of Verity Stob at The Register (review)

Other
 "Aspect-Oriented Programming with AspectJ" at Slashdot 

1963 births
Place of birth missing (living people)
Living people
20th-century pseudonymous writers
21st-century pseudonymous writers
Pseudonymous women writers
20th-century British journalists
21st-century British journalists
British columnists
British women columnists
British satirists
Women satirists